Tevfik Kış (10 August 1934 – 4 September 2019) was a Turkish European, World and Olympic champion sports wrestler in the Light heavyweight class (87 kg) and a trainer. He won the gold medal in men's Greco-Roman wrestling at the 1960 Olympics.

Born 1934 in the village of Pelitçik in the Kargı district in the Çorum Province, he began wrestling in 1956. Competing in Greco-Roman style, Kış became a gold medalist in wrestling at the 1960 Summer Olympics. He won later World and European championships. After his unsuccessful participation at the 1968 Summer Olympics in Mexico City, he retired from the active sports and served then as trainer of his country's national team. Kış was a co-founder of the Turkish Wrestling Foundation and was active on its board.

He was married with two children and lived in Ankara running a restaurant.

Achievements
 1959 Balkan Championships in Istanbul, Turkey - silver (Light heavyweight)
 1959 Mediterranean Games in Beirut, Lebanon - gold (Light heavyweight)
 1960 Olympics in Rome, Italy - gold (Light heavyweight)
 1961 World Championships in Yokohama, Japan - 4th (Light heavyweight)
 1962 World Championships in Toledo, Ohio, U.S. - gold (Light heavyweight)
 1963 World Championships in Helsinki, Finland - gold (Light heavyweight)
 1965 World Championships in Tampere, Finland - 4th (Light heavyweight)
 1966 World Championships in Helsinki, Finland - silver (Light heavyweight)
 1966 European Championships in Essen, Germany - gold (Light heavyweight)
 1967 European Championships in Minsk, Soviet Union - 5th (Light heavyweight)

References

External links
 

1934 births
2019 deaths
People from Kargı
Wrestlers at the 1960 Summer Olympics
Wrestlers at the 1968 Summer Olympics
Turkish male sport wrestlers
Olympic gold medalists for Turkey
Olympic medalists in wrestling
Medalists at the 1960 Summer Olympics
Mediterranean Games gold medalists for Turkey
Competitors at the 1959 Mediterranean Games
Mediterranean Games medalists in wrestling
20th-century Turkish people
21st-century Turkish people